The 1992 Nigerian Senate election in Kaduna State was held on July 4, 1992, to elect members of the Nigerian Senate to represent Kaduna State. Tsoho Abubakar Ikara representing Kaduna West and Musa Bello representing Kaduna Central won on the platform of National Republican Convention, while Babale Maikarfi representing Kaduna East won on the platform of the Social Democratic Party.

Overview

Summary

Results

Kaduna West 
The election was won by Tsoho Abubakar Ikara of the National Republican Convention.

Kaduna Central 
The election was won by Musa Bello of the National Republican Convention.

Kaduna East 
The election was won by Babale Maikarfi of the Social Democratic Party.

References 

Kad
Kaduna State Senate elections
July 1992 events in Nigeria